Lawrence Butler is a former US ambassador.

Lawrence Butler may also refer to:

Lawrence Butler (basketball)
Lawrence Butler (baseball), baseball player
Lawrence W. Butler, special effects designer

See also
Larry Butler (disambiguation)